Thermopsis californica,  known by the common name California goldenbanner,  is a species of flowering plant in the legume family.

The plant is endemic to California, from regions in San Diego County and Southern California, to Modoc County and northeastern California.

It was previously included within the species Thermopsis macrophylla.

Varieties
Varieties include:
Thermopsis californica var. argentata — silvery false lupine; endemic to Northern California.
Thermopsis californica var. californica — endemic to coastal California.
Thermopsis californica var. semota — velvety false lupine; endemic to the Peninsular Ranges.

References

External links
CalFlora Database: Thermopsis californica (California goldenbanner)
Jepson Manual: Thermopsis californica 
Thermopsis californica — U.C. Photo gallery

Sophoreae
Endemic flora of California
Flora of the Cascade Range
Natural history of the California chaparral and woodlands
Natural history of the California Coast Ranges
Natural history of the Peninsular Ranges
Natural history of the San Francisco Bay Area
Natural history of the Transverse Ranges
Plants described in 1876
Flora without expected TNC conservation status